Lecithocera stomobapta is a moth in the family Lecithoceridae. It was described by Edward Meyrick in 1929. It is found in southern India.

The wingspan is 12–14 mm. The forewings are rather dark fuscous, the bases of the scales are pale or whitish. The stigmata form suffused roundish dark fuscous spots, the plical somewhat before the first discal, sometimes confluent with it, sometimes an additional spot beneath and confluent with the second discal. There is an ochreous-whitish mark on the costa at three-fourths, sometimes somewhat extended along the edge. The hindwings are grey.

References

Moths described in 1929
stomobapta